Jamalpur is a village of Ballia district in the Indian state of Uttar Pradesh. Its population is 269, per the 2011 Census. Jamalpur village is located in Rasra Tehsil of Ballia district in Uttar Pradesh, India. Jamalpur's nearest railway station is Ballia.

References 

Villages in Ballia district